The Yukon Sourdough Rendezvous Festival is an annual celebration that happens in Whitehorse, Yukon, Canada in February. In 2014, the festival celebrated its 50th anniversary.

References

External links 
 Yukon Sourdough Rendezvous Festival Webpage

Festivals in Yukon
Winter festivals in Canada
Recurring events established in 1964
1964 establishments in Canada
1964 in Yukon
Culture of Whitehorse